The 1938 North Dakota gubernatorial election was held on November 8, 1938. Democratic nominee John Moses defeated Republican nominee John N. Hagan with 52.47% of the vote.

Primary elections
Primary elections were held on June 28, 1938.

Democratic primary

Candidates
John Moses, former Mercer County State's Attorney
Oliver Rosenberg

Results

Republican primary

Candidates
John N. Hagan, North Dakota Commissioner of Agriculture and Labor
Thorstein H. H. Thoresen, incumbent Lieutenant Governor

Results

General election

Candidates
John Moses, Democratic
John N. Hagan, Republican

Results

References

1938
North Dakota
Gubernatorial